Hot Natured is a British-American electronic music group consisting of Jamie Jones and Lee Foss, both co-founders of critically acclaimed electronic dance music label, Hot Creations. The group later on added members Ali Love and Luca Cazal from Infinity Ink.

Discography

Studio albums
 Different Sides of the Sun (2013)

Singles/EPs
 "Off World Lover" (2015)
 "Benediction" (2014) 
 "Isis (Magic Carpet Ride)" (2013) 
 "Reverse Skydiving" (2013) 
 "Benediction" (2012)  
 "Forward Motion" (2011) 
 "Nino Brown" (2011)
 "Equilibrium" (2010)
 "H.E.A.D.S" (2008)

Remixes
Phoenix - "Entertainment" (2013)
Alexis Raphael - "Into The Light (Hot Natured Remix)" (2012)
Waifs & Strays - "Body Shivers (Hot Natured Remix)" (2011)

Performances
On July 6, 2013, Hot Natured planned to perform in New York City at Terminal 5, but had to cancel the show due to problems with traveling visas.
On March 14, Hot Natured performed at the CRSSD Festival in San Diego, CA.
On April 10 & 17, 2015, Hot Natured performed at the Coachella Music Festival.
On April 16 Hot Natured performed at The El Rey Theater in Los Angeles, CA.

American electronic music groups
American house musicians
English house musicians
Deep house musicians
DJs from London